Cat Daddies is a 2022 American documentary movie directed, produced and edited by Mye Hoang, it stars Nathan Kehn, Jordan Lide, David Durst, Ridoanul Haque Siyam, and Ryan Robertson played lead and supporting roles.

Plot 
A heart-warming collective portrait of eight unique men whose lives have been changed by their love for cats. Some of these men will navigate the unprecedented challenges of 2020 with the help of these feline friends.

Cast
 Nathan Kehn
 Jordan Lide
 David Durst
 Ryan Robertson
 Ridoanul Haque Siyam

Reception

References

Other websites 

2022 documentary films